KBIX (1490 AM, "Las Americas 1490 AM & 102.9 FM") is an American radio station licensed to serve  the community of Muskogee, Oklahoma, United States. The station is owned by Antonio Perez, through licensee Grupo Teletul Multimedia, LLC.

The station was assigned the call sign "KBIX" by the Federal Communications Commission (FCC).

History 
KBIX was a charter member of the Oklahoma Network when it was formed in 1937. In 2019 it change format sports to Regional Mexican.

Translators

References

External links
KBIX official website

BIX
BIX
Muskogee County, Oklahoma
Radio stations established in 1975